Prachi Sinha is an Indian model and actress. She is best known for playing the role of Vardaan in the popular television soap opera Vishkanya on Zee TV. She was also cast in the film Angry Young Man.

Filmography

Films

Television

References

External links 
 
 Prachi Sinha Official twitter Account

Living people
1996 births
Indian film actresses
Indian soap opera actresses
21st-century Indian actresses